Ma peau aime is the debut studio album by French singer and songwriter Alma. It was released in France on 5 May 2017 by Warner Music Group. The album peaked at number 33 on the French Albums Chart.

Singles
"La chute est lente" was released as the lead single from the album on 10 June 2016. "Requiem" was released as the second single from the album on 13 January 2017. The song peaked at number 25 on the French Singles Chart. On 9 February 2017, France 2 announced that Alma would represent the France at the 2017 Eurovision Song Contest at the International Exhibition Centre in Kyiv, Ukraine. As a member of the "Big 5", France automatically qualified to compete in the final which took place on 13 May 2017, Alma finished 12th with 135 points.

Track listing

Charts

Release history

References

2017 albums